Amphitheatre Parish is a civil parish of Robinson County, New South Wales, Australia.

Geography
The parish is located on the Barrier Highway between Cubba and Cobar. The parish on Buckwaroon Creek has a flat topography and is vegetated by a sparse shrub cover.

References

Parishes of New South Wales